Nore Davis (born April 10, 1984) is an American stand-up comedian and actor who has appeared on Comedy Central and MTV television programming.

Biography 
Nore Davis was born on April 10, 1984 in New York City. He first started doing stand-up comedy during his teenage years while living in Yonkers, New York. His interest in stand-up comedy was originally a side hobby for him, as he only did open mic nights and performed on college campuses. However, after realizing that college wasn't for him, he knew that comedy was the only thing that he wanted to do for a living. Before eventually deciding to work full-time as a comedian, Davis used to work at a gas station, and then later in graphic design.

Early on in their careers, Davis was good friends with the then-unknown Amy Schumer. They used to share their comedy ideas together, and when Schumer eventually got her own show on Comedy Central entitled, Inside Amy Schumer, Davis appeared in one of the sketches in the pilot episode.

Davis has also made television appearances on Russell Simmons Presents, Last Week Tonight, MTV's Nikki & Sara Live, NickMom Night Out, The Artie Lange Show, and had a minor speaking role in HBO's Boardwalk Empire. He has also been seen in many videos on CollegeHumor.

On November 28, 2014, Davis released his first comedy album called, "Home Game."

Davis is currently working with Comedy Central for his own show called, "In Between with Nore Davis."

On November 23, 2018, Davis released his second comedy album, Too Woke, on Blonde Medicine. The album was recorded at Union Hall in Brooklyn, New York in early 2018. The album was released in two volumes of 7 tracks each. It was named one of the Top Ten Best Comedy Albums of 2018 of by Vulture.

In "Argestes", the 6th episode of the 2nd season of Succession, Davis played comedian Zell Simmons.

Personal life
Davis resides in New York City. He has a transgender brother, Khalil. He is a fan of the Teenage Mutant Ninja Turtles, with his favorite character being Raphael. His comedy influences include Tracy Morgan, Bill Cosby, Richard Pryor, Bill Burr, Eric Idle, Joan Rivers, Eddie Murphy, Chris Rock, and Patrice O'Neal.

References

External links 
 

1984 births
African-American male actors
African-American male comedians
American male comedians
African-American stand-up comedians
American stand-up comedians
American male film actors
American male television actors
American male voice actors
Living people
Male actors from New York City
American sketch comedians
Comedians from New York City
21st-century American comedians
21st-century American male actors
21st-century African-American people
20th-century African-American people